Embratur, also known as the Brazilian Tourist Board, is a federal, state-owned agency reporting to the Brazilian Ministry of Tourism. It was formed in 1966 and works exclusively on the promotion, marketing and supporting to the trading of services, products and tourist destinations of Brazil abroad.

Embratur works to promote tourism within Brazil, and has entered agreements with states such as Amazonas and the Federal District. The current president of Embratur is Marcelo Freixo.

References

External links
 Embratur Official Website  
 Visit Brasil (Official tourism portal in English)

Tourism in Brazil
Tourism agencies